Ronald Waterhouse may refer to:

 Ronald Waterhouse (judge) (1926–2011), a judge of the High Court of England and Wales
 Ronald Waterhouse (private secretary) (1878–1942), a British Army and Air Force officer and private secretary